Pallas University of Applied Sciences is a university of applied sciences that provides art education in Tartu, Estonia. It was founded on 1 August 2000. The university is situated in Karlova. The rector is Vallo Nuust.

History 

On grounds of precedence, Pallas is related to an educational institution of arts founded in Tartu in 1919. During the period from 1919 to 1960 Tartu Art College has existed as secondary and higher education institution under many names.

 1919–1924 Art School of the Pallas Arts Association
 1933–1940 Higher Art School Pallas
 1940–1941 Public Higher Art School named after Konrad Mägi
 1942–1943 Tartu Higher Courses of Fine Arts
 1943–1944 Higher Art School Pallas
 1944 Public Higher Art School named after Konrad Mägi
 1944–1951 Estonian SSR Tartu State Art Institute
 1951–1955 Tartu affiliate of the Estonian SSR Art Institute
 1951–1960 Tartu School for Fine Arts
 1960–2000 Tartu Art School
 2000–2018 Tartu Art College
 2018– Pallas University of Applied Sciences

Administration
 Rector: since 2005 Vallo Nuust (born 1962)
 Vice Rector of Studies: Kristina Tamm (born 1976)
 Vice Rector: since 2020 Ivi Lillepuu (born 1969)

Departments

Department of Photography

In 1997 the Tartu Art School established a programme in Photography. The architect of the initial curriculum and the director of the program was Vallo Kalamees.

Since 2000, the Department of Photography is chaired by Professor Peeter Linnap PhD (born 1960)

Department of Painting

In 1997 The Tartu Art School established a programme called Painting and Wall Paintings’ Restoration; its traditions were founded by Heli Tuksam. In 2015 the Department of Painting was closed at the University of Tartu and as of 2016 the Department of Paintings at Tartu Art College was renamed to Department of Painting.

In 2000-2018, the Department of Painting was chaired by Professor Heli Tuksam (born 1956). Since 2018, the department is led by Kaspar Tamsalu (born 1988)

Department of Media and Advertisements Design
In 1997 The Tartu Art School established the Department of Computer Graphics, headed by Are Tralla. 
The curriculum of the department is divided into four major fields: print media, media design, interactive design and 3D design in a digital environment. 
Since 2008, the Department of the media and Advertisement Design is led by Jaanus Eensalu (born 1964).

Department of Furniture
The main goal of the Furniture and Restoration curriculum is to educate professional furniture designers and conservators. The curriculum has two main directions: furniture design and furniture restoration. Since 2006, the Department of Furniture is chaired by Jaak Roosi (born 1956).

Department of Leather Design
In 2000-2013 the Department of Leather design was chaired by Professor Rutt Maantoa. In 2013-2019 the department was chaired by Maila Käos. Since September 2019, the department is chaired by Professor Rene Haljasmäe MA (born 1973).

Department of Sculpture
Instruction in the Department of Sculpture is based on classical art education.

In 2011-2014, the Department of Sculpture was chaired by Jaan Luik (born 1953). Since 2014 the department is chaired by Anne Rudanovski (born 1964)

Department of Textile
The Department of Textile is a member of the international professional organization European Textile Networks and cooperates with the Estonian Association of Textile Artists as well as with the higher education institutions teaching specialty of textiles and fashion in Estonia or worldwide, and with the entrepreneurs in the field.

Since 2000, the Department of Textile is chaired by Professor [Aet Ollisaar] (born 1966).

Study programmes
Pallas University of Applied Sciences is a professional higher education institution.

The persons who have completed professional higher education studies are awarded a diploma certifying the completion of the study program.

At Pallas, students can study in state-commissioned or on tuition student places. It is also possible to study in non-state-commissioned external and practitioner student places.

 Students studying in on tuition student places have the same rights as students studying in state-commissioned student places.
 Students who have acquired secondary art education can study in non-state commissioned practitioner student places.
 In external study, it is possible for students to use study services offered by TAC on the basis of curriculum and contract. External students are not included in the student list of Pallas.

Gallery Pallas
Tartu Art College opened their own art gallery in 2009. As the largest exposition area in Tartu, it introduces and exhibits the works and activities of the departments, students and faculty of Pallas University of Applied Sciences to citizens and tourists alike. The exhibitions of Pallas' partner schools and visiting faculty are also displayed there. During its first year of operations, 143 00 people visited the gallery. Exhibitions change at least once a month, and the gallery often hosts workshops and seminars.

See also
Estonian Academy of Art
List of universities in Estonia

References

External links

Universities and colleges in Estonia
Art College
Educational institutions established in 2000
Art schools in Estonia
2000 establishments in Estonia